Josef Jindřišek (born 14 February 1981) is a Czech football defender who plays for Bohemians 1905.

With more than 400 caps, he is a legend of the Czech First League and of Bohemians 1905. He is also one of the oldest players that appeared in the league.

References

External links

Profile at iDNES.cz
Guardian Football

1981 births
Living people
People from Jablonec nad Nisou District
Czech footballers
Czech First League players
Bohemians 1905 players
FK Jablonec players
SK Sigma Olomouc players
Association football defenders